Mailman Mueller is a 1953 West German comedy film directed by John Reinhardt and starring Heinz Rühmann, Heli Finkenzeller and Wolfgang Condrus. It was shot in Agfacolor at the Tempelhof Studios in West Berlin with sets designed by the art directors Willi Herrmann and Heinrich Weidemann. Location shooting took place at Meersburg on Lake Constance.

Plot summary

Cast 
Heinz Rühmann as Titus Müller
Heli Finkenzeller as Charlotte Müller
Gisela Meyen as Mieze
Wolfgang Condrus as Günter
Rainer Gröbel as Karl-Heinz
Susanne von Almassy as Mirabella
Harald Paulsen as Bertram
Trude Hesterberg as Aunt Anna
Rolf Kutschera as Bobby
Oskar Sima as Mr. Strobel
Else Reval as Mrs. Strobel
Eckart Dux as Hugo
Angel Angelo
Carl de Vogt
Ludwig Trautmann
Franz Arzdorf
Curt Lucas
Alexa von Porembsky
Consuelo Korn
Peter Paul Richter

Soundtrack 
Egon Kaiser - "Movie music"
Liselotte Malkowsky - "Drei Rosen im Mai" (Music by Friedrich Schröder, lyrics by Ignor)

References

Bibliography
 Körner, Torsten. Der kleine Mann als Star: Heinz Rühmann und seine Filme der 50er Jahre. Campus Verlag, 2001.

External links 

1953 films
1953 comedy films
German comedy films
West German films
1950s German-language films
Films directed by John Reinhardt
Films about postal systems
Films shot at Tempelhof Studios
1950s German films